Malays (Jawi: أورڠ ملايو) are an Austronesian ethnic group native to eastern Sumatra, the Malay Peninsula and coastal Borneo, as well as the smaller islands that lie between these locations — areas that are collectively known as the Malay world. These locations are today part of the countries of Malaysia, Indonesia (eastern and southern Sumatra, Bangka Belitung Islands, West Kalimantan and Riau Islands), southern part of Thailand (Pattani, Satun, Songkhla, Yala and Narathiwat), Singapore and Brunei Darussalam.

There is considerable linguistic, cultural, artistic and social diversity among the many Malay subgroups, mainly due to hundreds of years of immigration and assimilation of various regional ethnicity and tribes within Maritime Southeast Asia. Historically, the Malay population is descended primarily from the earlier Malayic-speaking Austronesians and Austroasiatic tribes who founded several ancient maritime trading states and kingdoms, notably Brunei, Kedah, Langkasuka, Gangga Negara, Chi Tu, Nakhon Si Thammarat, Pahang, Melayu and Srivijaya.

The advent of the Malacca Sultanate in the 15th century triggered a major revolution in Malay history, the significance of which lies in its far-reaching political and cultural legacy. Common definitive markers of Malayness — the religion of Islam, the Malay language and traditions — are thought to have been promulgated during this era, resulting in the ethnogenesis of the Malay as a major ethnoreligious group in the region. In literature, architecture, culinary traditions, traditional dress, performing arts, martial arts and royal court traditions, Malacca set a standard that later Malay sultanates emulated. The golden age of the Malay sultanates in the Malay Peninsula, Sumatra and Borneo saw many of their inhabitants, particularly from various tribal communities like the Batak, Dayak, Orang Asli and the Orang Laut become subject to Islamisation and Malayisation. In the course of history, the term "Malay" has been extended to other ethnic groups within the "Malay world"; this usage is nowadays largely confined to Malaysia, where descendants of immigrants from these ethnic group are termed as anak dagang ("traders") and who are predominantly from the Indonesian archipelago such as the Acehnese, Banjarese, Bugis, Mandailing, Minangkabau and Javanese.

Throughout their history, the Malays have been known as a coastal-trading community with fluid cultural characteristics. They absorbed, shared and transmitted numerous cultural features of other local ethnic groups, such as those of Minang and Acehnese.

Etymology

The epic literature, the Malay Annals, associates the etymological origin of "Melayu" to Sungai Melayu ('Melayu river') in Sumatra, Indonesia. The term is thought to be derived from the Malay word melaju, a combination of the verbal prefix 'me' and the root word 'laju', meaning "to accelerate", used to describe the accelerating strong current of the river.

As a place name (toponym) 
Prior to the 15th century, the term "Melayu" and its similar-sounding variants appear to apply as an old toponym to the Strait of Malacca region in general.

 Malaya Dwipa, "Malaya Dvipa", is described in chapter 48, Vayu Purana as one of the provinces in the eastern sea that was full of gold and silver. Some scholars equate the term with Sumatra, but several Indian scholars believe the term should refer to the mountainous Malay peninsula, while Sumatra is more correctly associated with Suvarnadvipa.
 Maleu-kolon – a location in the Golden Chersonese, from Ptolemy's work, Geographia.
 Mo-lo-yu – mentioned by Yijing, a Tang dynasty Chinese Buddhist monk who visited the Southeast Asia in 688–695. According to Yijing, the Mo-Lo-Yu kingdom was located at a distance of 15 days sailing from Bogha (Palembang), the capital of Sribhoga (Srivijaya). It took a 15-day sail as well to reach Ka-Cha (Kedah) from Mo-lo-yu; therefore, it can be reasoned that Mo-Lo-Yu would lie halfway between the two places. A popular theory relates Mo-Lo-Yu with the Jambi in Sumatra, however the geographical location of Jambi contradicts with Yi Jing's description of a "half way sail between Ka-Cha (Kedah) and Bogha (Palembang)". In the later Yuan Dynasty (1271–1368) and Ming Dynasty (1368–1644), the word Ma-La-Yu was mentioned often in Chinese historical texts — with changes in spelling due to the time span between the dynasties — to refer to a nation near the southern sea. Among the terms used was "Bôk-lá-yù", "Mók-là-yū" (木剌由), Má-lì-yù-er (麻里予兒), Oō-laì-yu (巫来由) — traced from the written source of monk Xuanzang) and Wú-laī-yû (無来由).
 Malayur – inscribed on the south wall of the Brihadeeswarar Temple in Tamil Nadu. It was described as a kingdom that had "a strong mountain for its rampart" in Malay peninsula, that fell to the Chola invaders during Rajendra Chola I's campaign in the 11th century.
 Bhūmi Mālayu – (literally "Land of Malayu"), a transcription from Padang Roco Inscription dated 1286 CE by Slamet Muljana. The term is associated with Dharmasraya kingdom.
 Ma-li-yu-er – mentioned in the chronicle of Yuan Dynasty, referring to a nation of Malay peninsula that faced the southward expansion of Sukhothai Kingdom, during the reign of Ram Khamhaeng. The chronicle stated: "..Animosity occurred between Siam and Ma-li-yu-er with both killing each other ...". In response to the Sukhothai's action, a Chinese envoy went to the Ram Khamhaeng's court in 1295 bearing an imperial decree: "Keep your promise and do no evil to Ma-li-yu-er".
 Malauir – mentioned in Marco Polo's account as a kingdom located in the Malay peninsula, possibly similar to the one mentioned in Yuan chronicle.
 Malayapura – (literally "city of Malaya" or "fortress of Malaya"), inscribed on the Amoghapasa inscription dated 1347 CE. The term was used by Adityawarman to refer to Dharmasraya.

Other suggestions include the Javanese word mlayu (as a verb: to run, participle: fugitive), or the Malay term melaju (to steadily accelerate), referring to the high mobility and migratory nature of its people. De Barros (1552) mentioned that Iskandar Shah named the Malaios (Malays) so because of the banishment of his father from his country. Albuquerque explained that Parameswara fled (malayo) from the kingdom of Palembang to Malacca.

As an ethnic name (ethnonym) 
The word "Melayu" as an ethnonym, to allude to a clearly different ethnological cluster, is assumed to have been made fashionable throughout the integration of the Malacca Sultanate as a regional power in the 15th century. It was applied to report the social partialities of the Malaccans as opposed to foreigners as of the similar area, especially the Javanese and Thais This is evidenced from the early 16th century Malay word-list by Antonio Pigafetta who joined the Magellan's circumnavigation, that made a reference to how the phrase chiara Malaiu ('Malay ways') was used in the maritime Southeast Asia, to refer to the al parlare de Malaea (Italian for "to speak of Malacca").

Classical Malay literature described the Malays in a more narrow sense than the modern interpretation. Hikayat Hang Tuah (ca. 1700, manuscript ca. 1849) only identifies Malay as the subject of Malacca Sultanate; Brunei, at that time, is not considered Malay. Hikayat Patani (manuscript: 1876) for example, does not call Patani and Brunei as Malay, that term is only used for Johor. Kedah is not included as Malay in the Kedah chronicle. Hikayat Aceh (ca. 1625, manuscript ca. 1675) linked Malay ethnicity with Johor, but certainly not Aceh or Deli.

Origins

Proto-Malay models

Also known as Melayu asli (aboriginal Malays) or Melayu purba (ancient Malays), the Proto-Malays are of Austronesian origin and thought to have migrated to the Malay archipelago in a long series of migrations between 2500 and 1500 BC. Notable Proto-Malays of today are Moken, Jakun, Orang Kuala, Temuan and Orang Kanaq. The Encyclopedia of Malaysia: Early History, has pointed out a total of three theories of the origin of Malays:
 The Yunnan theory (published in 1889) – The theory of Proto-Malays originating from Yunnan approximately 4,000 to 6,000 years ago. The theory is supported by R.H Geldern and his team who theorized that their migration occurred from the Mekong River to the Malay Peninsula. Other evidence that supports this theory includes stone tools found in the Malay Archipelago being analogous to Central Asian tools, which shows the similarity of Malay and Assamese customs.
 The New Guinea/Seafarers theory (published in 1965) – The migration of seafarers with strong oceanographic skills who travelled from island to island between New Zealand and Madagascar. The theory claims the Malay's morphology at the time were similar to that of Negroids.
 The Taiwan theory (published in 1997) – The migration of a group of people from Southern China occurred 6,000 years ago, some moved to Taiwan (today's Taiwanese aborigines are their descendants), then to the Philippines and later to Borneo (roughly 4,500 years ago) (today's Dayak and other groups). These ancient people also split with some heading to Sulawesi and others progressing into Java, and Sumatra, all of which now speak languages that belong to the Austronesian Language family. The final migration was to the Malay Peninsula roughly 3,000 years ago. A sub-group from Borneo moved to Champa in modern-day Central and South Vietnam roughly 4,500 years ago. There are also traces of the Dong Son and Hoabinhian migration from Vietnam and Cambodia. All these groups share DNA and linguistic origins traceable to the island that is today Taiwan, and the ancestors of these ancient people are traceable to southern China.

Deutero-Malays

The Deutero-Malays are an Iron Age people descended partly from the subsequent Austronesian peoples who came equipped with more advanced farming techniques and new knowledge of metals. The Deutero-Malay settlers were not nomadic compared to their predecessors, instead they settled and established kampungs which serve as the main units in society. These kampungs were normally situated on the riverbanks or coastal areas and generally self-sufficient in food and other necessities. By the end of the 1st century BC, these kampungs were beginning to engage in some trade with the outside world. The Deutero-Malays are considered the direct ancestors of the present-day Malay people.

Expansion from Sundaland model
A more recent theory holds that rather than being populated by expansion from the mainland, the Ice Age populations of the Malay peninsula, neighbouring Indonesian archipelago, and the then-exposed continental shelf (Sundaland) instead developed locally from the first human settlers and expanded to the mainland. Proponents of this theory hold that this expansion gives a far more parsimonious explanation of the linguistic, archaeological, and anthropological evidence than earlier models, particularly the Taiwan model. This theory also draws support from recent genetic evidence by Human Genome Organisation suggesting that the primary peopling of Asia occurred in a single migration through Southeast Asia; this route is held to be the modern Malay area and that the diversity in the area developed mainly in-place without requiring major migrations from the mainland. The expansion itself may have been driven by rising sea levels at the end of the Ice Age.

Proponent Stephen Oppenheimer has further theorised that the expansion of peoples occurred in three rapid surges due to rising sea levels at the end of the Ice Age, and that this diaspora spread the peoples and their associated cultures, myths, and technologies not just to mainland Southeast Asia, but as far as India, the Near East, and the Mediterranean. Reviewers have found his proposals for the original settlement and dispersal worthy of further study, but have been sceptical of his more diffusionist claims.

Genetic evidence 
Malays are an Austronesian-speaking ethnic group of Insular Southeast Asia, and the Malay Peninsula. A study in 2021 concluded that a distinctive Basal-East Asian lineage (sometimes termed as 'East- and Southeast Asian lineage' (ESEA)), which is ancestral to modern East and Southeast Asians, Polynesians, and Siberians, originated in Mainland Southeast Asia at ~50,000BC, and expanded through multiple migration waves southwards and northwards respectively. Basal-East Asian ancestry, as well as later Austroasiatic-associated ancestry, spread into Maritime Southeast Asia prior to the Austronesian expansion. Austronesian-speakers themselves are suggested to have arrived on Taiwan and the northern Philippines between 10,000BC to 7,000BC from coastal southern China, and spread from there throughout Insular Southeast Asia. The authors concluded that the Austronesian expansion into Insular Southeast Asia and Polynesia was outgoing from the Philippines rather than Taiwan, and that modern Austronesian-speaking peoples, such as the Malays, have largely ancestry from the earliest Basal-East Asians, Austroasiatic migrants from Mainland Southeast Asia, and Austronesian-speaking seafarers from the Philippines, without much admixture from previous groups.

History

Pre-Hindu civilisation

Deep in the pristine estuary of the Merbok River, lies an abundance of historical relics of the past. Ancient monumental ruins, buildings, temples, harbour and shipwrecks were all cloistered and entombed in the soil for two millennia. At its zenith, the massive settlement sprawled across ~1000 kilometers and dominated the northern plains of the Malay Peninsula. By contemporary accounts, the area is known as the lost city of Sungai Batu. Founded in 788 BC, it is among the oldest of civilisations in Southeast Asia and a potential progenitor of the Kedah Tua kingdom.

The historical landscape of the area was bound to a flourishing iron industry, with archaeological findings unearthed various historical mines, warehouses, factories, a harbour; together with a vibrant plethora of superior-quality ores, furnace, slag and ingots. Additionally, the peculiar Tuyere iron-smelting technique mobilised in Sungai Batu is hailed as oldest of its kind in the world. The produce was highly sought after and exported to various corners of the Old World, including ancient India, China, Middle East, Korea and Japan. Based on early Sanskrit reports, the area was known as "the iron bowl".

The settlement also narrated a glimpse of the ancient religious undertakings prior to the mass Indianisation of the region. The early inhabitants of the Malay Archipelago was chronicled to be the adherence of indigenous animism and shamanism, strikingly similar to other indigenous religions of Eastern Asia, such as Shintoism. The ancient folk religion vividly characterised that every element of nature possessed a spirit, known as semangat. The semangat has the governing power to richly bless or mercilessly curse the society, hence the spirit should always be pleased and entertained. In Sungai Batu, archaeological evidence unmasked several ceremonial and religious architectures devoted to worshipping the sun and mountains.

In addition to Sungai Batu, the early Malay archipelago also witnessed the monumental development of other subsequent ancient large urban settlements and regional polities, driven by a predominantly cosmopolitan agrarian society, thriving skilled craftsmanship, multinational merchants and foreign expatriates. Chinese records noted the names of Akola, P’an P’an, Tun-Sun, Chieh-ch'a, Ch'ih-tu, among few. Upon the fifth century AD, these settlements had morphed into sovereign city-states, collectively fashioned by an active participation in the international trade network and hosting diplomatic embassies from China and India.

Indian influence

There is no definite evidence which dates the first Indian voyages across the Bay of Bengal but conservative estimates place the earliest arrivals on Malay shores at least 2,000 years ago. The discovery of jetty remains, iron smelting sites, and a clay brick monument dating back to 110 CE in the Bujang Valley, shows that a maritime trading route with South Indian Tamil kingdoms was already established since the second century.

The growth of trade with India brought coastal people in much of maritime Southeast Asia into contact with the major religions of Hinduism and Buddhism. Throughout this area a most profound in influence has been exerted by India which seems to have introduced into it architecture, sculpture, writing, monarchy, religion, iron, cotton and a host of elements of higher culture. Indian religions, cultural traditions and Sanskrit began to spread across the land. Hindu temples were built in the Indian style, local kings began referring to themselves as "raja" and more desirable aspects of Indian government were adopted.

The beginning of the Common Era saw the rise of Malay states in the coastal areas of the Sumatra and Malay Peninsula; Srivijaya, Nakhon Si Thammarat Kingdom, Gangga Negara, Langkasuka, Kedah, Pahang, the Melayu Kingdom and Chi Tu. Between the 7th and 13th centuries, many of these small, often prosperous peninsula and Sumatran maritime trading states, became part of the mandala of Srivijaya, a great confederation of city-states centred in Palembang, Kewu Plain, Chaiya, and Jambi.

Srivijaya's influence spread over all the coastal areas of Sumatra and the Malay Peninsula, western Java and western Borneo, as well as the rest of the Malay Archipelago. Enjoying both Indian and Chinese patronage, its wealth was gained mostly through trade. At its height, the Old Malay language was used as its official language and became the lingua franca of the region, replacing Sanskrit, the language of Hinduism. The Srivijayan era is considered the golden age of Malay culture.

The glory of Srivijaya however began to wane after the series of raids by the Tamil Chola dynasty in the 11th century. By the end of the 13th century, the remnants of the Malay empire in Sumatra was finally destroyed by the Javanese invaders during the Pamalayu expedition (Pamalayu means "war against the Malays").

The complete destruction of Srivijaya caused the diaspora of the Srivijayan princes and nobles. Rebellions against the Javanese rule ensued and attempts were made by the fleeing Malay princes to revive the empire, which left the area of southern Sumatra in chaos and desolation. In 1299, through the support of the loyal servants of the empire, the Orang laut, a Malay prince of Srivijaya origin, Sang Nila Utama established the Kingdom of Singapura in Temasek. His dynasty ruled the island kingdom until the end of the 14th century, when the Malay polity once again faced the wrath of Javanese invaders. In 1400, his great-great-grandson, Parameswara, headed north and established the Malacca Sultanate. The new kingdom succeeded Srivijaya and inherited much of the royal and cultural traditions, including a large part of the territories of its predecessor.

In the north of the peninsula, the power vacuum left by the collapse of Srivijaya was filled by the growth of the kingdom of Tambralinga in the 12th century. Between the 13th to early 14th century, the kingdom succeeded to incorporate most of the Malay Peninsula under its mandala. The campaign led by Chandrabhanu Sridhamaraja (1230–1263) managed to capture Jaffna kingdom in Sri Lanka between 1247 and 1258. He was eventually defeated by the forces of the Pandyan dynasty from Tamil Nadu in 1263 and was killed by the brother of Emperor Sadayavarman Sundara Pandyan I. The invasion marked an unrivaled feature in the history of Southeast Asia, it was the only time there was an armed maritime expedition beyond the borders of the region.

The cultivation of Malay polity system also diffused beyond the proper Sumatran-Peninsular border during this era. The age avowed by exploration and migration of the Malays to establish kingdoms beyond the traditional Srivijayan realm. Several exemplification are the enthronement of a Tambralingan prince to reign the Lavo Kingdom in present-day Central Thailand, the foundation of Rajahnate of Cebu in the Visayas and the establishment of the Tanjungpura Kingdom in what is now West Kalimantan, Borneo. The expansion is also eminent as it shaped the ethnogenesis development of the related Acehnese and Banjar people and further spreading the Indian-influenced Malay ethos within the regional sphere.

Islamisation

The period of the 12th and 15th centuries saw the arrival of Islam and the rise of the great port-city of Malacca on the southwestern coast of the Malay Peninsula — two major developments that altered the course of Malay history.

The Islamic faith arrived on the shores of what are now the states of Kedah, Perak, Kelantan and Terengganu, from around the 12th century. The earliest archaeological evidence of Islam from the Malay peninsula is the Terengganu Inscription Stone dating from the 14th century found in Terengganu state, Malaysia.

By the 15th century, the Malacca Sultanate, whose hegemony reached over much of the western Malay Archipelago, had become the centre of Islamisation in the east. As a Malaccan state religion, Islam brought many great transformation into the Malaccan society and culture, and It became the primary instrument in the evolution of a common Malay identity. The Malaccan era witnessed the close association of Islam with Malay society and how it developed into a definitive marker of Malay identity. Over time, this common Malay cultural idiom came to characterise much of the Malay Archipelago through the Malayisation process. The expansion of Malaccan influence through trade and Dawah brought with it together the Classical Malay language, the Islamic faith, and the Malay Muslim culture; the three core values of Kemelayuan ("Malayness").

In 1511, the Malaccan capital fell into the hands of Portuguese conquistadors. However, Malacca remained an institutional prototype: a paradigm of statecraft and a point of cultural reference for successor states such as Johor Sultanate (1528–present), Perak Sultanate (1528–present), Pahang Sultanate (1470–present), Siak Sri Indrapura Sultanate (1725–1946), Pelalawan Sultanate (1725–1946) and Riau-Lingga Sultanate (1824–1911).

Across the South China Sea in the 14th century, another Malay realm, the Bruneian Empire was on the rise to become the most powerful polity in Borneo. By the middle of the 15th century, Brunei entered into a close relationship with the Malacca Sultanate. The sultan married a Malaccan princess, adopted Islam as the court religion, and introduced an efficient administration modelled on Malacca. Brunei profited from trade with Malacca but gained even greater prosperity after the great Malay port was conquered by the Portuguese in 1511. It reached its golden age in the mid-16th century when it controlled land as far south as present day Kuching in Sarawak, north towards the Philippine Archipelago. The empire broadened its influence in Luzon by defeating Datu Gambang of the Kingdom of Tondo and by founding a satellite state, Kota Seludong in present-day Manila, setting up the Muslim Rajah, Rajah Sulaiman I as a vassal to the Sultanate of Brunei. Brunei also expanded its influence in Mindanao, Philippines when Sultan Bolkiah married Leila Macanai, the daughter of the Sultan of Sulu. However, states like the kingdom of Pangasinan, Rajahnate of Cebu and Kedatuan of Madja-as tried to resist Brunei's and Islam's spread into the Philippines. Brunei's fairly loose river based governmental presence in Borneo projected the process of Malayisation. Fine Malay Muslim cultures, including the language, dress and single-family dwelling were introduced to the natives primarily from ethnic Dayaks, drawing them into the Sultanate. Dayak chiefs were incorporated into the Malay hierarchy, being given the official titles of Datuk, Temenggong and Orang Kaya. In West Borneo, the development of such sultanates of Sarawak, Sambas, Sukadana and Landak tells a similar tale of recruitment among Dayak people.

Other significant Malay sultanates were the Kedah Sultanate (1136–present), Kelantan Sultanate (1411–present), Patani Sultanate (1516–1771), Reman Sultanate (1785–1909) and Legeh Sultanate (1755–1902) that dominated the northern part of the Malay peninsula. Jambi Sultanate (1460–1907), Palembang Sultanate (1550–1823) and Indragiri Sultanate (1298–1945) controlled much of the southeastern shores of Sumatra. Deli Sultanate (1632–1946), Serdang Sultanate (1728–1948), Langkat Sultanate (1568–1948) and Asahan Sultanate (1630–1948) governed eastern Sumatra. While West Borneo observed the rise of Pontianak Sultanate (1771–1950), Mempawah Sultanate (1740–1950) and Matam Sultanate (1590–1948).

Colonisation by foreign powers

Between 1511 and 1984, numerous Malay kingdoms and sultanates fell under direct colonisation or became the protectorates of different foreign powers, from European colonial powers like Portuguese, Dutch and British, to regional powers like Aceh, Siam and Japan.
In 1511, the Portuguese Empire captured the capital city of the Malacca Sultanate. The victorious Portuguese however, were unable to extend their political influence beyond the fort of Malacca. The Sultan maintained his overlordship on the lands outside Malacca and established the Johor Sultanate in 1528 to succeed Malacca. Portuguese Malacca faced several unsuccessful retaliation attacks by Johor until 1614, when the combined forces of Johor and the Dutch Empire, ousted the Portuguese from the peninsula. As per agreement with Johor in 1606, the Dutch later took control of Malacca.

Historically, Malay states of the peninsular had a hostile relation with the Siamese. Malacca sultanate herself fought two wars with the Siamese while northern Malay states came intermittently under Siamese dominance for centuries. In 1771, the Kingdom of Siam under the new Chakri Dynasty abolished the Patani Sultanate and later annexed a large part of Kedah Sultanate. Earlier, the Siamese under Ayutthaya Kingdom have had already absorbed Tambralinga and overrun the Singgora Sultanate in the 17th century. Between 1808 and 1813, the Siamese imposed a new administrative structure and created the semi-independent Malay kingdoms of Patani, Saiburi, Nongchik, Yaring, Yala, Reman and Rangae from Greater Patani and similarly obtained Rundung, Kupa, Tongkah, Terang while carving Setul, Langu, Perlis, Kubang Pasu from the Kedah Kingdom in 1839. In 1902, the Siamese stripped the political powers of all the 7 kingdoms of Patani following a planned revolt for independence against the central government. The coup de grâce was cultivated by 1906, when the Siamese redraw the border of the Patani territories and installed a new governance and administrative system.

In 1786, the island of Penang was leased to East India Company by Kedah Sultanate in exchange of military assistance against the Siamese. In 1819, the company also acquired Singapore from Johor Empire, later in 1824, Dutch Malacca from the Dutch, followed by Dindings from Perak by 1874 and finally Labuan from Brunei in 1886. All these trading posts officially known as Straits Settlements in 1826 and became the crown colony of British Empire in 1867. Additionally, the Straits Settlements would also encompass the Indian Ocean islands of Christmas Island and the Cocos Islands in 1886. British intervention in the affairs of Malay states was formalised in 1895, when Malay rulers accepted British Residents in administration, and the Federated Malay States was formed. In 1909, Kedah, Kelantan, Terengganu and Perlis were handed over by Siam to the British. These states along with Johor, later became known as Unfederated Malay States. During the World War II, all these British possessions and protectorates that collectively known as British Malaya were occupied by the Empire of Japan.

The twilight of the vast Bruneian Empire began during the Castille War against the Spanish conquistadors who arrived in the Philippines from Mexico. The war resulted in the end of the empire's dominance in the present-day Philippine archipelago. The decline further culminated in the 19th century, when the Sultanate lost most of its remaining territories in Borneo to the White Rajahs of Sarawak, North Borneo Chartered Company and its lower Borneo vassals to Dutch East India Company. Brunei was a British protectorate from 1888 to 1984.

Following the Anglo-Dutch Treaty of 1824 which divided the Malay Archipelago into a British zone in the north and a Dutch zone in the south, all Malay sultanates in Sumatra and Southern Borneo became part of the Dutch East Indies. Though some of Malay sultans maintain their power under Dutch control, some were abolished by the Dutch government under the accusation of retaliation against the colonial rule, like the case of Palembang Sultanate in 1823, Jambi Sultanate in 1906 and Riau Sultanate in 1911.

In the late 19th century, Germany was aiming to gain a foothold in the Malay Peninsula. They have made a repeated request to Siam on acquiring Langkawi as a naval base, with a possible expansion to the islands of Butong and Teretak since 1899. The plan was largely derived under the scheme of the German Grand Admiral, Alfred von Tirpitz who envisioned Langkawi as a vital-base for Berlin's worldwide submarine cable network. Langkawi was perceived to be ideal, due to its deep natural harbour and a suitable geographical location, between the German Kiautschou Bay in China and its colonies in the Pacific on one side, and German East Africa on the other. The island is also desired as it can act as a point of assembly and restocking for its warship during the times of war. A foothold in Langkawi would also guaranteed a further commercial interest to German private investors to cater the needs of port, a coaling station and the future naval base.

In October 1899, Behn, Meyer & Co acting on behalf of the German colonial government approached the Rajah Muda (Crown Prince) of Kedah to lease the island for 50 years with the sum of 60,000 dollars, as the sultan was ill and unable to attend the meeting. By November 1899, the "Deutsche Uebersee-Gesellschaft" (German Overseas Association) was formed by the German trading and shipping company in order to provide loan amounting to 1,000,000 marks to the sultanate. Nonetheless, the plan has come to a major halt, as the application was dismissed by the Kingdom of Siam. The dismissal was largely derived from the Secret Siamese Treaty of 1897, that has required the consent of the British in order for Siam to lease its territory. The crown prince of Kedah was later summoned to Bangkok by Prince Damrong and was warned not to release any concession to other foreign powers without the agreement of Siam.

A further bid by German was allegedly occurred in 1900, when Germany was purported to have approached the Sultan of Trang & Palien on the possibility of acquiring Pulau Lontar, an island located north of Langkawi. Although this report was dismissed by Prince Dewawongse of Siam.

The prospect of a German annexation of the northern Peninsula and the potential of its involvement for a commercial canal or railway network across the Isthmus of Kra, posed a serious threat to the British economic interest and political dominance in the region. Severely alarmed, the British and the Siamese entered the Anglo-Siamese Treaty of 1909, partitioning the Peninsula between the British and the Siamese jurisdiction. 

The Anglo-Siamese Treaty attested that the Siamese to control the upper portion of the peninsular while the lower region was to be held under the British dominance. The British originally planned for the inclusion of Reman, Legeh and Setul under their dominion together with a cluster of northern Malay states. Nonetheless, they only managed to secure Kedah, Kelantan, Terengganu and Perlis under the agreement. The treaty also witnessed the state of Kedah being reduced the most, with Tarutao, Butang islands groups, Sendawa, Langgu and the principality of Setul were all being divorced into the Siamese hands, a similar fate was also followed in northeastern coast of Kelantan that was demanded to renounced their right on the Tabal district, including Sungai Golok and Sungai Padi; while Perlis lost its Pujoh district. Then-British controlled Federated Malay State of Perak however, saw an enlargement of their land area, with southern territories of Reman being transferred into the state and additionally Kelantan received Jeli from Legeh (which had been under Siamese jurisdiction since 1902). The Siamese then abdicated Tunku Baharuddin, the King of Setul, the sole Malay kingdom remained under Siamese territory in 1916. The treaty nonetheless, manage to seal the fate of the Malay states of Kedah, Kelantan, Terengganu and Perlis to retain a degree of their sovereign powers under the British colonial government, a legacy that can be witnessed today in the Malaysian administrative system.

Later during the Japanese occupation of the Dutch East Indies, British Malaya and Borneo, the Japanese maintained a favourable relationship with the Sultans and other Malay leaders, this is partially composed to foster the trust of the Malay public that was generally loyal towards the sultan. Nonetheless, in a series of massacres known as Pontianak incidents, the Japanese assassinated virtually all of the West Kalimantan Malay sultans, including a large numbers of Malay intelligentsias after they have been falsely accused of planning an uprising and coup d'etat against the Japanese. It was believed that West Kalimantan took two generations to recover from the near-total collapse of the Malay ruling class in the territory.

Malay nationalism

Despite the widespread distribution of the Malay population throughout the Malay archipelago, modern Malay nationalism was only significantly mobilised in the early twentieth century British Malaya i. e. the Malay Peninsula. In the Netherlands Indies, the struggle against colonisation was characterised by the trans-ethnic nationalism: the so-called "Indonesian National Awakening" united people from the various parts of the Dutch colony in the development of a national consciousness as "Indonesians". In Brunei, despite some attempt made to arouse Malay political consciousness between 1942 and 1945, there was no significant history of ethnic-based nationalism. In Thailand however, Pattani separatism against Thai rule is regarded by some historians as a part of the wider sphere of peninsula Malay nationalism. A similar secession movement can be witnessed in modern-day Indonesia, where both autochthonously-Malay provinces of Riau and Riau Islands sought to gain independence under the name of Republic of Riau. Nevertheless, what follows is specific to the peninsula Malay nationalism that resulted in the formation of the Federation of Malaya, later reconstituted as Malaysia.

The earliest and most influential instruments of Malay national awakening were the periodicals which politicised the position of the Malays in the face of colonialism and alien immigration of non-Malays. In spite of repressions imposed by the British colonial government, there were no less than 147 journals and newspapers published in Malaya between 1876 and 1941. Among notable periodicals were Al-Imam (1906), Pengasuh (1920), Majlis (1935) and Utusan Melayu (1939). The rise of Malay nationalism was largely mobilised by three nationalist factions — the radicals distinguishable into the Malay left and the Islamic group which were both opposed to the conservative elites.

The Malay leftists were represented by Kesatuan Melayu Muda, formed in 1938 by a group of Malay intelligentsia primarily educated in Sultan Idris Training College, with an ideal of Greater Indonesia. In 1945, they reorganised themselves into a political party known as Partai Kebangsaan Melayu Malaya (PKMM). The Islamists were originally represented by Kaum Muda consisted of Middle east — educated scholars with Pan-Islamic sentiment. The first Islamic political party was Partai Orang Muslimin Malaya (Hizbul Muslimin) formed in March 1948, later succeeded by Pan-Malayan Islamic Party in 1951. The third group was the conservatives consisted of the westernised elites who were bureaucrats and members of royal families that shared a common English education mostly at the exclusive Malay College Kuala Kangsar. They formed voluntary organisations known as Persatuan Melayu ('Malay Associations') in various parts of the country with the primary goals of advancing and protecting the interests of Malays. In March 1946, 41 of these Malay associations formed United Malays National Organisation (UMNO), to assert Malay dominance over Malaya.

The Malay and Malayness has been the fundamental basis for Malay ideology and Malay nationalism in Malaysia. All three Malay nationalist factions believed in the idea of a Bangsa Melayu ('Malay Nation') and the position of Malay language, but disagreed over the role of Islam and Malay rulers. The conservatives supported Malay language, Islam and Malay monarchy as constituting the key pillars of Malayness, but within a secular state that restricted the political role of Islam. The leftists concurred with the secular state but wanted to end feudalism, whereas the Islamic group favoured ending royalty but sought a much larger role of Islam.

Since the foundation of the Republic of Indonesia as a unitary state in 1950, all traditional Malay monarchies in Indonesia were abolished, and the Sultans positions reduced to titular heads or pretenders. The violent demise of the sultanates of Deli, Langkat, Serdang, Asahan and other Malay principalities in East Sumatra during the "Social revolution" of 1946 orchestrated by the Communist Party of Indonesia, drastically influenced their Malayan counterparts and politically motivating them against the PKMM's ideal of Greater Indonesia and the Islamists' vision of Islamic Republic.

In March 1946, UMNO emerged with the full support of the Malay sultans from the Conference of Rulers. The new movement forged a close political link between rulers and subjects never before achieved. It generated an excited Malay public opinion which, together with the surprising political apathy of the non-Malays, led to Britain's abandonment of the radical Malayan Union plan. By July, UMNO succeeded in obtaining an agreement with the British to begin negotiations for a new constitution. Negotiations continued from August to November, between British officials on the one hand, and the Sultans' representatives and UMNO and the other.

Two years later the semi independent Federation of Malaya was born. The new constitutional arrangement largely reverted to the basic pattern of pre-war colonial rule and built on the supremacy of the individual Malay states. Malay rights and privileges were safeguarded. The traditional Malay rulers thus retained their prerogatives, while their English-educated descendants came to occupy positions of authority at the centre, which was being progressively decolonised. In August 1957, the Federation of Malaya, the West's last major dependency in Southeast Asia, attained independence in a peaceful transfer of power. The federation was reconstituted as Malaysia with the addition in 1963 of Singapore (separated in 1965), Sabah and Sarawak.

Culture

Language

The Malay language is one of the most prominent languages of the world, especially of the Austronesian family. Variants and dialects of Malay are used as an official language in Brunei, Malaysia, Indonesia and Singapore. The language is also spoken in southern Thailand, Cocos Islands, Christmas Island, Sri Lanka. It is spoken natively by approximately 33 million people throughout the Malay Archipelago and is used as a second language by an estimated 220 million.

The oldest form of Malay is descended from the Proto-Malayo-Polynesian language spoken by the earliest Austronesian settlers in Southeast Asia. This form would later evolve into Old Malay when Indian cultures and religions began penetrating the region. Old Malay contained some terms last until today, but remained unintelligible to modern speakers, while the modern language is already largely recognisable in written Classical Malay, which the oldest form dating back to 1303 CE. Malay evolved into Classical Malay through the gradual influx of numerous Arabic and Persian vocabulary when Islam made its way to the region, changing significantly in the process. Initially, Classical Malay was a diverse group of dialects, reflecting the varied origins of the Malay kingdoms of Southeast Asia. One of these dialects, that was developed in the literary tradition of the Malacca Sultanate in the 15th century, eventually became predominant.

The Malaccan era was marked with the transformation of the Malay language into an Islamic language, in similar fashion to Arabic, Persian, Urdu and Swahili. An adapted Arabic script called Jawi was used replacing the Kawi script, Islamic religious and cultural terminologies were abundantly assimilated, discarding many Hindu-Buddhist words, and Malay became the language of Islamic medium of instruction and dissemination throughout Southeast Asian region. At the height of Malacca's power in the 15th century, the Classical Malay spread beyond the traditional Malay speaking world and resulted in a lingua franca that was called Bahasa Melayu pasar ("Bazaar Malay") or Bahasa Melayu rendah ("Low Malay") as opposed to the Bahasa Melayu tinggi ("High Malay") of Malacca. It is generally believed that Bazaar Malay was a pidgin and the most important development, however, has been that pidgin creolised, creating several new languages such as the Ambonese Malay, Manado Malay and Betawi language.

European writers of the 17th and 18th centuries, such as Tavernier, Thomassin and Werndly describe Malay as "language of the learned in all the Indies, like Latin in Europe". It is also the most widely used during British and Dutch colonial era in the Malay Archipelago. The reversed was seen in the Spanish East Indies, where mass latinisation of the archipelago during the colonial years resulted the historical coup de grâce of the Malay language in the Philippines.

The dialect of Johor Sultanate, the direct successor of Malacca, became the standard speech among Malays in Singapore and Malaysia, and it formed the original basis for the standardised Indonesian language.

Apart from the standard Malay, developed within the Malacca-Johor sphere, various local Malay dialects exist. For example, the Bangkanese, the Bruneian, the Jambian, the Kelantanese, the Kedahan, the Negeri Sembilanese, the Palembangnese, the Pattanese, the Sarawakian, the Terengganuan, and many others.

The Malay language was historically written in Pallawa, Kawi and Rencong. After the arrival of Islam, Arabic-based Jawi script was adopted and is still in use today as one of the two official scripts in Brunei and as an alternative script in Malaysia. Beginning from the 17th century, as a result of British and Dutch colonisation, Jawi was gradually replaced by the Latin-based Rumi script which eventually became the official modern script for Malay language in Malaysia, Singapore, and Indonesia, and co-official script in Brunei.

Literature

The rich oral literature and classical literature of the Malays contain a great number of portraits of the people, from the servant to the minister, from the judge to the Rajas, from the ancient to the very contemporary periods, which together form the amorphous identity of the Malays.

Considering the softness and mellifluence of the Malay language, which lends itself easily to the requirements of rhyme and rhythm, the originality and beauty in Malay literature can be assessed in its poetical elements. Among the forms of poetry in Malay literature are — the Pantun, Syair and Gurindam.

The earliest form of Malay literature was the oral literature and its central subjects are traditional folklore relating to nature, animals and people. The classical Malay folklore is composed of traditional songs and music, heroic poems, animal fables, ghost stories, past events, fairy tales, symbolic lore, myths and bardic tales. Each of the stories possessed its own energy in terms of character, spirit, backdrop and storytelling and was largely crafted with the intend of happiness, guidance, educating, reminiscing, explaining, among few. The folklore were memorised and passed from one generation of storytellers to the next. Many of these tales were also written down by penglipur lara (storytellers) for example: Hikayat Malim Dewa, Hikayat Malim Deman, Hikayat Raja Donan, Hikayat Anggun Cik Tunggal, and Hikayat Awang Sulung Merah Muda.

When Indian influences made their way to the Malay Archipelago around 2000 years ago, Malay literature began incorporating Indian elements. Literature of this time is mostly translations of Sanskrit literature and romances, or at least some productions inspired by such, and is full of allusions to Hindu mythology. Probably to this early time may be traced such works as Hikayat Seri Rama (a free translation of the Ramayana), Hikayat Bayan Budiman (an adaptation of Śukasaptati) and Hikayat Panca Tanderan (an adaptation of Hitopadesha).

The era of classical Malay literature started after the arrival of Islam and the invention of Jawi script (Arabic based Malay script). Since then, Islamic beliefs and concepts began to make its mark on Malay literature. The Terengganu Inscription Stone, which is dated to 1303, is the earliest known narrative Malay writing. The stone is inscribed with an account of history, law, and romance in Jawi script. At its height, the Malacca Sultanate was not only the center of Islamisation, but also the center of Malay cultural expressions including literature. During this era, notable Middle Eastern literary works were translated and religious books were written in Malay language. Among famous translated works are Hikayat Muhammad Hanafiah and Hikayat Amir Hamzah.

The rise of Malay literature during the period was also penned by other homegrown literary composition coloured by mystical Sufism of the middle-east, the notable works of Hamzah Fansuri such as Asrar al-Arifin (Rahsia Orang yang Bijaksana; The Secret of the Wise), Sharab al-Asyikin (Minuman Segala Orang yang Berahi; The Drink of All the Passionate) and Zinat al-Muwahidin (Perhiasan Sekalian Orang yang Mengesakan; The Ornament of All the Devoted) can be seen as the magna opera of the era.

The most important piece of Malay literary works is perhaps the famed Malay Annals or Sulalatus Salatin. It was called "the most famous, distinctive and best of all Malay literary works" by one of the most prominent scholars in Malay studies, Sir Richard O. Winstedt. The exact date of its composition and the identity of its original author are uncertain, but under the order of Sultan Alauddin Riaayat Shah III of Johor in 1612, Tun Sri Lanang oversaw the editorial and compilation process of the Malay Annals.

In the 19th century, the Malay literature received some notable additions, including Kitab Ilmu Bedil (Book of Traditional Weaponry) that provides valuable details of traditional Malay ammunition and weaponry. The era also witnessed the wider usage of Malay medical journals, known as Kitab Tib. These works are indeed important as it serve as references to the Malay knowledge and technology during the classical era. Other 19th century Malay texts were written in Sumatra, these include the Kitab Pengetahuan Bahasa (Book of Linguistic Knowledge) by Raja Ali Haji and Perhimpunan Gunawan bagi Laki-Laki dan Perempuan (A Compendium of Charms for Men and Women) by Khatijah Terung, a wife of Raja Haji Abdullah bin Raja Hassan.

The same century also witnessed a monumental shift in the Malay literature through writings of Abdullah bin Abdul Kadir, a famous Malacca-born munshi of Singapore. Abdullah is regarded as the most cultured Malay who ever wrote, one of the greatest innovators in Malay letters and the father of modern Malay literature. His most important works are the Hikayat Abdullah (an autobiography), Kisah Pelayaran Abdullah ke Kelantan (an account of his trip for the government to Kelantan), and Kisah Pelayaran Abdullah ke Mekah (a narrative of his pilgrimage to Mecca 1854). His work was an inspiration to future generations of writers and marks an early stage in the transition from classical Malay literature to modern Malay literature.

In addition to

Religion

The early Malay communities were largely animists, believing in the existence of semangat (spirits) in everything. Around the opening of the common era, Hinduism and Buddhism were introduced by South Asian traders to the Malay Archipelago, where they flourished until the 13th century, just before the arrival of Islam brought by Arab, South Asian and Chinese Muslim traders.

In the 15th century, Islam of the orthodox Sunni sect flourished in the Malay world under the Malacca Sultanate. In contrast with Hinduism, which transformed early Malay society only superficially, Islam can be said to have been fully integrated in the daily life of the population. Since this era, the Malays are considered as ethnoreligious group and traditionally had a close identification with Islam  and they have not changed their religion since. This identity is so strong that it is said to become Muslim was to masuk Melayu (to enter Malayness).

Nevertheless, the earlier beliefs having deeper roots, they have maintained themselves against the anathemas of Islam — and indeed Sufism mysticism have become intertwined among the Malays, with the spirits of the earlier animistic world and some elements of Hinduism. Following the 1970s, Islamic revival (also referred as re-Islamisation) throughout the Muslim world, many traditions that contravene the teaching of Islam and contain elements of shirk were abandoned by the Malays. Among these traditions was the mandi safar festival (Safar bath), a bathing festival to achieve spiritual purity, in which can be discerned features similar to some of those of the Durga Puja of India.

A vast majority of modern ethnic Malays are the adherents of Sunni Islam and the most important Malay festivals are those of Islamic origin — Hari Raya Aidilfitri, Hari Raya Aidiladha, Awal Muharram, and Maulidur Rasul. It is considered apostasy for Malays to convert out of Islam in Malaysia and Brunei. However, ethnic Malays living outside of these countries have also embraced other religions legally under the law.

Architecture

Various cultural influences, notably Chinese, Indian and Europeans, played a major role in forming Malay architecture. Until recent time, wood was the principal material used for all Malay traditional buildings. However, numerous stone structures were also discovered particularly the religious complexes from the time of Srivijaya and ancient isthmian Malay kingdoms.

Candi Muara Takus and Candi Muaro Jambi in Sumatra are among the examples that associated with the architectural elements of Srivijaya Empire. However, Srivijayan architecture was mostly represented at Chaiya (now a province in Thailand) in the Malay peninsula, which was an important centre during the Srivijaya period. The type of structure consists of a cell-chamber to house the Buddha image and the summit of structure was erected in the form of stupa with successive, superimposed terraces which is the best example at Wat Pra Borom That of Chaiya.

There is also evidence of Hindu shrines or Candi around south Kedah between the mount Jerai and the Muda River valley, an area known as Bujang Valley. Within an area of about 350 square kilometres, 87 early historic religious sites have been reported and there are 12 candis located on mountain tops, a feature which suggests may derive from pre-historic Malay beliefs regarding sanctity of high places.

Early reference on Malay architecture in Malay peninsula can be found in several Chinese records. A 7th-century Chinese account tells of Buddhist pilgrims calling at Langkasuka and mentioned the city as being surrounded by a wall on which towers had been built and was approached through double gates. Another 7th-century account of a special Chinese envoy to Red Earth Kingdom in the Malay peninsula, recorded that the capital city had three gates more than hundred paces apart, which were decorated with paintings of Buddhist themes and female spirits.

The first detailed description of Malay architecture was on the great wooden Istana of Mansur Shah of Malacca (reigned 1458–1477). According to Sejarah Melayu, the building had a raised seven bay structures on wooden pillars with a seven tiered roof in cooper shingles and decorated with gilded spires and Chinese glass mirrors.

The traditional Malay houses are built using simple timber-frame structure. They have pitched roofs, porches in the front, high ceilings, many openings on the walls for ventilation, and are often embellished with elaborate wood carvings. The beauty and quality of Malay wood carvings were meant to serve as visual indicators of the social rank and status of the owners themselves.

Throughout many decades, the traditional Malay architecture has been influenced by Bugis and Java from the south, Siamese, British, Arab and Indian from the north, Portuguese, Dutch, Aceh and Minangkabau from the west and Southern Chinese from the east.

Visual art

Wood carving is a part of classical Malay visual arts. The Malays had traditionally adorned their monuments, boats, weapons, tombs, musical instrument, and utensils by motives of flora, calligraphy, geometry and cosmic features. The art is done by partially removing the wood using sharp tools and following specific patterns, composition and orders. The art form, known as ukir, is hailed as an act of devotion of the craftsmen to the creator and a gift to his fellowmen.

The art form is mainly attributed to the abundance of timber on the Malay Archipelago and also by the skillfulness of the woodcarvers that have allowed the Malays to practice woodcarving as a craft. The natural tropical settings where flora and fauna are abundant has inspired the motives to be depicted in abstract or stylised form into the timber board. With the coming of Islam, geometric and Islamic calligraphy form were introduced in the wood carving. The woods used are typically from tropical hardwood species which is known to be durable and can resist the attacks of fungi, power-boots beetles and termites.

A typical Malay traditional houses or mosque would have been adorned with more than 20 carved components. The carving on the walls and the panels allow the air breeze to circulate effectively in and out of the building and can let the sunlight illuminate the interior of the structure. At the same time, the shadow cast by the panels would also create a shadow based on the motives adding the beauty on the floor. Thus, the carved components perform both functional and aesthetic purposes.

Pottery

Under the Malay culture, pottery is not solely witnessed as a mere household utensil. It is perceived as a work of art, a paradigm of talent, embroidered with aesthetic, legacy, perseverance and religious devotion. The Malay earthen is usually unglazed, with the ornamental designs were carved when the pottery is semi-dried during its construction process.

According to several studies, the native Malay pottery industry has developed indigenously from the period of great antiquity and has since encapsulates a high-level of culture sophistication. It also has been noted that the design features of the Malay pottery suggested the absence of the foreign influence prior to the 19th century, a paradox considering the vast cultural contact between the Malays and the outside world.

Among the renowned traditional Malay pottery includes Mambong of Kelantan, molded from clay and identified with the colour of terracotta. It is usually assumed the form as cooking utensils. In the west coast, the raven-coloured Labu Sayung of Kuala Kangsar is honoured for gourd-formed jars. There are also several variants of Labu, including Labu Tela, Labu Kepala, Labu Gelugor Tela and Labu Gelugor Kepala.

Other forms of Malay traditional pottery are: The Belanga, commonly in a wide rim and a round base, the pot usually mobilised to cook curries. It is held that the structure of the earthen would aid the heat to be evenly distributed, correlating to its round base. A smaller version of the Belanga is called periok, used for rice-preparation; The Buyong, commonly defined by a straight collar and a spherical body, oftentime used as a water jar; The Terenang, the angular Terenang is used as a canister, especially in the coastal Malay regions of Kelantan, Patani and Terengganu; The Bekas Bara, a small container, usually crafted for the use of incense; The Jambangan, a traditional Malay vase, usually for aesthetic purposes and Geluk, a small water storage.

Cuisine

Different Malay regions are all known for their unique or signature dishes—Pattani, Terengganu and Kelantan for their nasi dagang, nasi kerabu and keropok lekor; Pahang and Perak for its durian-based cuisine, gulai tempoyak; Kedah and Penang for their northern-style asam laksa and rojak; Satun and Perlis for its bunga kuda dessert; Negeri Sembilan for its lemak-based dishes; Malacca for their spicy cincalok; Singapore for their rojak bandung and roti prata; Riau for its ikan patin (Pangasius fish) dishes, gulai ikan patin and asam pedas ikan patin; Riau Islands for their sup ikan; Deli Malays of North Sumatra for their nasi goreng teri medan and gulai ketam; Jambi for its ikan mas panggang and tempoyak; Palembangese Malays of South Sumatra for their pempek, mi celor and nasi minyak; Bangka Belitung for its siput gonggong and terang bulan; West Kalimantan and Sarawak for its bubur pedas and ayam pansuh; Brunei for their nasi katok and unique ambuyat dish; and Cape Malays of South Africa for its bobotie, boeber and koe'sister.

The main characteristic in traditional Malay cuisine is undoubtedly the generous use of spices. The coconut milk is also important in giving the Malay dishes their rich, creamy character. The other foundation is belacan (shrimp paste), which is used as a base for sambal, a rich sauce or condiment made from belacan, chillies, onions and garlic. Malay cooking also makes plentiful use of lemongrass and galangal.

Nearly every Malay meal is served with rice, the staple food in many other East Asian cultures. Although there are various type of dishes in a Malay meal, all are served at once, not in courses. Food is eaten delicately with the fingers of right hand, never with the left which is used for personal ablutions, and Malays rarely use utensils. Because most of Malay people are Muslims, Malay cuisine follows Islamic halal dietary law rigorously. Protein intake are mostly taken from beef, water buffalo, goat, and lamb meat, and also includes poultry and fishes. Pork and any non-halal meats, also alcohol is prohibited and absent from Malay daily diet.

Nasi lemak, rice cooked in rich coconut milk probably is the most popular dish ubiquitous in Malay town and villages. Nasi lemak is considered as Malaysia's national dish. While Nasi Minyak and Nasi Hujan Panas, rice broiled with ghee and spices is hailed as a ceremonial dish for special occasions, especially during the traditional Malay weddings.

Another example is Ketupat or nasi himpit, glutinous compressed rice cooked in palm leaves, is popular especially during Idul Fitri or Hari Raya or Eid ul-Fitr. Various meats and vegetables could be made into Gulai or Kari, a type of curry dish with variations of spices mixtures that clearly display Indian influence already adopted by Malay people since ancient times. Laksa, a hybrid of Malay and Peranakan Chinese cuisine is also a popular dish. Malay cuisine also adopted and received visible influence from some of their closest neighbours' cuisine traditions, such as rendang adopted from the Minangkabaus in Pagaruyung, and satay from Java, however Malay people has developed their own distinctive taste and recipes.

Performing arts

The Malays have diverse kinds of music and dance which are fusions of different cultural influences. Typical genres range from traditional Malay folk dances dramas like Mak Yong to the Arab-influenced Zapin dances. Choreographed movements also vary from simple steps and tunes in Dikir barat to the complicated moves in Joget Gamelan.

Traditional Malay music is basically percussive. Various kinds of gongs provide the beat for many dances. There are also drums of various sizes, ranging from the large rebana ubi used to punctuate important events to the small jingled-rebana (frame drum) used as an accompaniment to vocal recitations in religious ceremonies.

Nobat music became part of the Royal Regalia of Malay courts since the arrival of Islam in the 12th century and only performed in important court ceremonies. Its orchestra includes the sacred and highly revered instruments of nehara (kettledrums), gendang (double-headed drums), nafiri (trumpet), serunai (oboe), and sometimes a knobbed gong and a pair of cymbals.

Indian influences are strong in a traditional shadow play known as Wayang Kulit where stories from Hindu epics; Ramayana & Mahabharata form the main repertoire. There are four distinctive types of shadow puppet theatre that can be found in Malay peninsula; Wayang Gedek, Wayang Purwa, Wayang Melayu and Wayang Siam. Nonetheless, the art and the storytelling of Wayang Purwa and Wayang Siam denote a regional influence in fused with the Javanese and Siamese respectively, while Wayang Melayu and Wayang Gedek narrated a more autochthonously Malay form and fashion.

Other well-known Malay performing arts are; Bangsawan theatre, Dondang Sayang love ballad and Mak Inang dance from Malacca Sultanate, Jikey and Mek Mulung theatre from Kedah, Asyik dance and Menora dance drama from Patani and Kelantan, Ulek mayang and Rodat dance from Terengganu, Boria theatre from Penang, Canggung dance from Perlis, Mukun narrative songs from Brunei and Sarawak, Gending Sriwijaya from Palembang, Serampang Dua Belas dance from Serdang. and Zapin Api firedance from Riau.

Traditional dress

The traditional Malay apparel and textile has been continuously morphed since the time of antiquity. Historically, the ancient Malays were chronicled to incorporate various natural materials as a vital source for fabrics, clothing and attire. The common era however, witnessing the early arrivals the merchants from east and west to the harbours of Malay archipelago, together they bought new luxurious items, including fine cotton and silks. The garments subsequently become a source of high Malay fashion and acquired a cultural role as the binding identity in the archipelago, especially in the Peninsula, Sumatra and the coastal areas of Borneo.

In Malay culture, clothes and textiles are revered as symbols of beauty, power and status. Numerous accounts in Malay hikayats stressed the special place occupied by textiles. The Malay handloom industry can be traced its origin since the 13th century when the eastern trade route flourished under Song dynasty. Mention of locally made textiles as well as the predominance of weaving in the Malay peninsula was made in various Chinese and Arab accounts. Among well-known Malay textiles are Songket, Batik, Telepok, Limar, Tenun, Kelingkam, Cindai, Pelangi and Tekad.

Classical Malay dress varies between different regions, but the most profound traditional dress in modern-day are Baju Kurung (for women) and Baju Melayu (for men), which both recognised as the national dress for Malaysia and Brunei, and also worn by Malay communities in Indonesia, Singapore, Myanmar and Thailand.

The word Baju Kurung, literary defined as "encase the body" of the wearer is tailored based on the Islamic principles of modesty, decency and humility. The practice is parallel to the Judaeo-Christian religious doctrine, as flaunting the intimate body parts is considered as forbidden in Islam. The interpretation was then absorbed to the Malay way of dressing and cultural perspective, this can be strongly witnessed upon the rule of Mansur Shah of Malacca in the 15th century, the sultan prohibited his female Muslim subjects in the public from wearing only a sarong from the bust downwards. Throughout the ages, The Malay Baju Kurung went into several reincarnation before assuming its current form. Due to the vastness of various Malay kingdoms in the archipelago, local and distinct forms of the Baju Kurung design patterns can also be witnessed in the region, including Bengkulu, Kedah, Jambi, Johor-Riau, Pahang and Palembang.

The corresponding mode of Baju Kurung for men is known as "Baju Melayu". The upper part of the garment was made with the geometrical design almost similar with Baju Kurung and commonly paired with woven cloth known as the sarong. The pattern of the sarong may possessed a symbol of the person's marital status or the rank in the classical Malay society.

Other common classical Malay attire for men consists of a baju (shirt) or tekua (a type of a long sleeve shirt), baju rompi (vest), kancing (button), a small leg celana (trousers), a sarong worn around the waist, capal (sandal), and a tanjak or tengkolok (headgear); for the aristocrats, the baju sikap or baju layang (a type of coat) and pending (ornamental belt buckle) are also synonymous to be worn as a formal attire. It was also common for a pendekar (Malay warrior) to have a Kris tucked into the front fold of sarong.

In contrast to Baju Melayu which continued to be worn as ceremonial dress only, Baju Kurung is worn daily throughout the year by a majority of Malay women. Sighting of female civil servants, professional workers and students wearing Baju Kurung is common in Malaysia and Brunei.

Festivals and celebrations

The rise of Islam managed to redefine the Malay identity by the 15th century. Thus, resulting most of the Malay festivals and celebrations to run parallel with the Islamic calendar, albeit deeply ingrained with a strong sense of Malay character. The biannual Hari Raya (lit "the Great Day") observance of Aildifitri and Aidiladha are hailed as the grand celebrations universally across the Malay community. The two holidays are instrumental to commentate two major events and philosophy in the Islamic teaching and beliefs. The former signifies the triumph as a Muslim after a month of fasting and patience in Ramadan, while the latter is to observe the sacrifice made by Ibrahim (Abraham) under the name of Allah.

The Raya holidays usually commenced during the homecoming event known as Balik Kampung or Balik Raya which occurred a few days before the festival. During the Hari Raya, the Malays would celebrated by performing the Eid prayers, holding a grand feast and visiting friends, relatives and neighbours. A visit to the grave of the departed loved ones is also essential, as a sign of respect, love and honour.

Other major liturgical and religious ceremonies celebrated by the Malays include Ramadhan, a month-long holy month devoted by daytime fasting and various religious activities; Maulidur Rasul, a special grand procession to honour the birth of Prophet Muhammad; Ashura, remembrance of Muharram where the Malays would solemnly prepared a special dish, known as Bubur Ashura; Nisfu Syaaban, the Mid-Sha'ban observance, a special day of fasting for forgiveness; Nuzul Quran, the first revelation of the Quran; Israk dan Mikraj, the ascension Prophet Muhammed to the heavens and Awal Muharram, the Islamic New Year; the latter three celebrations are usually observed by holding a special sunat prayers, religious lectures and Islamic discussions in the mosque.

There are also a plethora of domestic regional cultural festivals and social events within different the Malay spheres. The coastal areas were historically known to observed the Mandi Safar or Puja Pantai ceremony, a purifying bath during the Islamic month of Safar, originally emulated from the ancient pre-Islamic Malay holy cleansing rituals; and Pesta Menuai, a harvest festival celebrated by the inland and agrarian Malay communities by traditional games, theatre, Joget and other repertoire of dance-play. However, both of the practice is gradually extinct owing from various social and economic revolution engineered in the Malay community in the 20th century. Additionally, many Malays are also known to participate in the imperial celebrations to honour the royal courts of their respective kingdoms.

The Islamic features also strongly embroidered the Malay celebrations in the individual level, a juxtaposition bonded to the spiritual rite of passage as a Muslim. The Malays would usually organised kenduri, a religious ceremonial banquet to celebrate or to seek blessing for an event. There are several philosophical variations of kenduri, raging from Doa Selamat (asking for divine favour and protection), Kesyukuran (for thanksgiving and gratitude), Melenggang Perut (ceremonial massage for a mother who is pregnant with her first child), Aqiqah and Cukur Jambul (newborn ceremony, for celebrating a new life), Bertindik (the first piercing ceremony for a female child), Khatam (a graduation ceremony, after a child's first full-reading of the Quran), Khatan (circumcision),  Kahwin (wedding), Arwah or Tahlil (prayers for a deceased person),  among few. The event is usually organised by the family and was traditionally aided by the community in a social gathering known as Rewang or Gotong-royong. During this ceremony, the whole family would be assisted by their neighbours and relatives, delegating various tasks raging from food preparations, venue management, logistic assembly and other technical control. Nevertheless, following the rise of urbanism in the contemporary Malay community, the practice of Rewang/Gotong-Royong is gradually superseded by hired-caterer services by the family.

Martial arts

Silat and its variants can be found throughout the Malay world: the Malay peninsula (including Singapore), the Riau Islands, Sumatra and coastal areas of Borneo. Archaeological evidence reveals that, by the 6th century, formalised combat arts were being practised in the Malay peninsula and Sumatra. The earliest forms of Silat are believed to have been developed and used in the armed forces of the ancient Malay kingdoms of Langkasuka (2nd century) and Srivijaya (7th century).

The influence of the Malay sultanates of Malacca, Johor, Pattani and Brunei has contributed to the spread of this martial art in the Malay Archipelago. Through a complex maze of sea channels and river capillaries that facilitated exchange and trade throughout the region, Silat wound its way into the dense rainforest and up into the mountains. The legendary Laksamana Hang Tuah of Malacca is one of the most renowned pesilat (Silat practitioners) in history and even considered by some as the father of Malay silat. Since the classical era, Silat Melayu underwent great diversification and formed what is today traditionally recognised as the source of Indonesian Pencak Silat and other forms of Silat in Southeast Asia.

Apart from Silat, Tomoi is also practised by Malays, mainly in the northern region of the Malay peninsula. It is a variant of Indo-Chinese forms of kickboxing which is believed to have been spread in the Southeast Asian mainland since the time of Funan Empire (68 AD).

Metal working

Upon the turn of the 17th century, gold, silver, iron and brass have all been perfectly molded to become part and parcel to the Malay society. The era witnessed the works of metal received a critical royal patronage. A multitude of Malay metalworks manifested as evidence of this era, raging from a peculiar Malay dagger known as Keris made of iron, down to the elaborate fine jewellery made from gold and silver. For the Malay nobles during this period, the works of pending (ornamental Belt buckle embellished with precious stones), keronsang (brooch) and cucuk sanggul (hairpins) were staged to become among the most sought item of fashion. The era also hosted a number of other prominent items in the Malay regalia cast in gold, including ceremonial box, Tepak sirih (Betel container) and parts of Keris. The art of working gold was predominantly done by repoussé and granulation techniques, in which the traditional methods can still be witnessed today. In the contemporary era, Malay gold jewels are mainly found in the form of anklets, bracelets, rings, necklaces, pendants and earrings.

For the Malay silverware, the works of silver are fairly known for its sophisticated and fine designs. It is usually crafted by repousse, filigree and niello techniques. The common traditional Malay items usually made of silver include pillow ends, belt buckles, matt corners, stoppers for water vessels, Keris sheaths and tobacco boxes. The Awan Larat (cloud patterns) and Kerawang (Vegetal motives) are among the popular designs for Malay decorative silver pillow ends and tobacco boxes.

The usage of brassware transcends a plethora of classical Malay social classes, being used by the members of nobility and commoners alike. The popularity of brassware is heavily contributed due to its durability, quality and affordability to all. The brassware can be narrowed into two distinctions, yellow brass for functional items and white for decorative purposes. It is often meticulously hammered and craved with various decorative designs in religious and floral motives. The usage of brass however, is best known for Tepak Sireh, a ceremonial tray for betel quid and for constructing certain musical instruments such as Gongs for the classical Malay Gamelan orchestra. Additionally, other prominent traditional Malay items made from metal includes flower vases, perfume sprinkles, serving trays, cooking pots, kettle and incense burners.

Weaponry

The Keris is one of the most revered items of Malay weaponry. Originally developed by the Javanese down south, the armament gradually assumed a Malay identity after entering the Srivijayan court, giving rise to characteristics distinct from its Javanese Keris forebears. By the time of Malacca in the 15th century, the evolution of the Malay Keris was perfected and possession of a Keris came to be regarded as in integral part of Malay culture, becoming a philosophical symbol, juxtapositioned in prestige, craftsmanship, masculinity and honour.

During the classical era, a Malay man was not seen without a Keris outside of his house. The absence of a Keris on a man was frowned upon, perceived as if he were parading naked to the public. Traditionally, a man of Malay extraction would own three types of Keris: Keris Pusaka (the Dynasty Keris, inherited from one generation to another), Keris Pangkat (the Status Keris, awarded in right of his position in Malay society) and Keris Perjuangan Dirinya (the Struggle Keris, literally defined as his personal Keris). There are many strict rules, regulations and taboos to be adhered to in owning a Keris. The blade of a Kris is usually coated with poisonous arsenic, thus crafting an excruciatingly lethal blade for its prey. Traditionally, each Keris is also regarded as possessing a spirit, known as semangat. Special rituals were to be conducted to nurture, preserve and guard the "soul" of the weapon. The spiritual approach is usually held every Malam Jumaat (Thursday night), with the blade is being purified with lime and smoked with incense, dedicated prayers and devoted mantras would be also recited upon to complement the mystic ritual.

The Malays and Javanese are abided by contrasting philosophical values pertaining to Keris-wearing. Traditionally, a Malay would embedded his Keris from the front, an honour that the weapon is more paramount compared to the wearer and a constant reminder that one is always equipped to combat the nemesis. The Javanese however, adhered to the principle that he should be more cautious and the Keris may solely be exercised during the time of need, thus cladding their Keris from behind. The Javanese also believed that by carrying their weapon that position, it would confuse the enemy.

Paradoxically, both groups shared a similar ideology addressing the hilt of the Keris. If the hilt faced up front, it serves as a testament that the man is prepared for a fight. Nevertheless, if the hilt is turned behind, it is an oath that the person is embracing for a reconciliation.

There are also a plethora of other forms of weaponry in the Malay arsenal, all were nevertheless equally revered in a correlating manner as the Keris. The Malays would classified the traditional weapons under 7 different structures: Tuju ("Direct", the large and heavy artillery, including the Malay cannons of Meriam, Ekor Lotong, Lela and Rentaka), Bidik ("Gun", a weapon with metal tube propelled by an ammunition, with the Malay forms of Terakor and Istingar), Setubuh ("A body", weapon in the similar dimension of a human body, referred to the Malay spears of Tongkat Panjang and Lembing), Selengan ("An arm", a large saber from the length of the shoulders to the tips of the fingers, constituting the Malay saber of Pedang and Sundang), Setangan ("A hand", a sword with the diameter measured from the elbow to the 3 fingers, including Badik Panjang and Tekpi), Sepegang ("A hold", smaller than the Setangan, a dagger with Keris and Badik in the category) and Segenggam ("A grab", the smallest in the category, the hand-sized blade, including Lawi Ayam, Kerambit, Kuku Macan and Kapak Binjai). Other items in the traditional Malay weaponry includes sumpit (Blowpipe) and Busur dan Panah (Bow and Arrow), which are distinct from the seven class of armaments. Additionally, the Malays also would deploy Zirah, a type of Baju Besi (armour) and Perisai (shield) as defense mechanisms during the armed conflict.

Traditional games

Traditional Malay games usually require craft skills and manual dexterity and can be traced their origins since the days of Malacca Sultanate. Sepak Raga and kite flying are among traditional games that were mentioned in the Malay Annals being played by nobilities and royalties of the Malay sultanate.

Sepak Raga is one of the most popular Malay games and has been played for centuries. Traditionally, Sepak raga was played in circle by kicking and keeps aloft the rattan ball using any part of the body except the arms and hands. It is now recognised as Malaysia's national sport and played in the international sporting events such as Asian Games and Southeast Asian Games.

Other popular game is Gasing spinning which usually played after the harvest season. A great skill of craftsmanship is required to produce the most competitive Gasing (top), some of which spin for two hours at a time.

Possibly the most popular Malay games is the Wau (a unique kind of kite from east coast of the Malay peninsula) or kite flying. Wau-flying competitions take place with judges awarding points for craftsmanship (Wau are beautiful, colourful objects set on bamboo frames), sound (all Malay kites are designed to create a specific sound as they are buffeted about in the wind) and altitude.

The Malays also have a variant of Mancala board game known as Congkak. The game is played by moving stones, marbles, beads or shells around a wooden board consisting of twelve or more holes. Mancala is acknowledged as the oldest game in the world and can be traced its origin since Ancient Egypt.
As the game dispersed around the globe, every culture has invented its own variation including the Malays.

Names and titles

Malay personal names are complex, reflecting the hierarchical nature of the society, and titles are considered important. Naming has undergone tremendous change, evolving with the times to reflect the different influences that the Malays been subjected to over the ages. Although some Malay names still retain parts of their indigenous Malay and Sanskrit influences, as Muslims, Malays have long favoured Arabic names as marks of their religion.

Malay names are patronymic and can consiste of up to four parts; a title, a given name, the family name, and a description of the individual's male parentage. Some given names and father's names can be composed of double names and even triple names, thereby generating a longer name. For example, one  Malaysian national footballer has the full name Mohd Zaquan Adha Abdul Radzak, where 'Mohd Zaquan Adha' is his triple given name and 'Abdul Radzak' is his father's double given name.

In addition to naming system, the Malay language also has an elaborate system of titles and honorifics, which are still extensively used in Malaysia and Brunei. By applying these Malay titles to a normal Malay name, a more complex name is produced. The former Prime Minister of Malaysia has the full name Dato' Seri Mohd Najib bin Tun Haji Abdul Razak, where 'Dato' Seri' is a Malay title of honour, 'Mohd Najib' is his personal name, 'bin' is derived from an Arabic word Ibnu meaning "son of" if in case of daughter it is replaced with binti, an Arabic word "bintun" meaning "daughter of", introduces his father's titles and names, 'Tun' is a higher honour, 'Haji' denotes his father's Hajj pilgrimage to Mecca, and 'Abdul Razak' is his father's personal name.
The more extremely complex Malay names however, belong to the Malay royalty. The reigning Yang di-Pertuan Agong of Malaysia has the full regnal name Kebawah Duli Yang Maha Mulia Seri Paduka Baginda Yang di-Pertuan Agong Al-Sultan Abdullah Ri'ayatuddin Al-Mustafa Billah Shah ibni Almarhum Sultan Haji Ahmad Shah Al-Musta'in Billah, while the reigning Sultan of Brunei officially known as Kebawah Duli Yang Maha Mulia Paduka Seri Baginda Sultan Haji Hassanal Bolkiah Mu'izzaddin Waddaulah ibni Al-Marhum Sultan Haji Omar 'Ali Saifuddien Sa'adul Khairi Waddien.

Sub-ethnic groups

 
Although only constituting 3.4% of the total population, ethnic Malays are one of the most widely distributed ethnicities in Indonesia. As shown on the map, outside the Indonesian archipelago, the Malay people inhabit the Malay Peninsula, forming the dominant ethnic group in peninsular Malaysia and a significant minority in Singapore, Thailand and southern Myanmar. The corridor of Bornean Malay territories begins north from southwestern Sabah, continues with the country of Brunei Darussalam, coastal Sarawak and continues down to Kalimantan.

See also

 Anti-Malay sentiment, racial prejudice against ethnic Malays
 Ghosts in Malay culture
 Ketuanan Melayu (Malay Supremacy)
 List of Malay people
 Malay folklore
 Malay Islamic Monarchy, the national philosophy of Brunei
 Malay tricolour
 Malay units of measurement

References

Bibliography

 
 
 
 
 
 
 
 
 
 
 
 
 
 
 
 
 
 
 
 
 
 
 
 
 
 
  (Abstracts of Dissertations Available on Microfilm or as Xerographic Reproductions February 1973)

Further reading
 
 
 
 
 
 
 
 
 
 

 
Ethnic groups in Southeast Asia
Ethnoreligious groups in Asia
Malaya
Malay Peninsula
Ethnic groups in Brunei
Ethnic groups in Indonesia
Ethnic groups in Sumatra
Ethnic groups in Sarawak
Ethnic groups in Sabah
Ethnic groups in Singapore
Maritime Southeast Asia
Muslim ethnoreligious groups
Austronesian peoples